Dumbuya is a Sierra Leonean surname that may refer to:
Ahmed Ramadan Dumbuya, Sierra Leonean politician
Dora Dumbuya, Sierra Leonean Christian evangelist preacher 
Mustapha Dumbuya (born 1987), Sierra Leonean football defender 
Kahota M.S. Dumbuya, Sierra Leonean military officer 
Sheku Badara Bashiru Dumbuya (born 1945), Sierra Leonean politician